Otto Godfrey Foelker (December 29, 1875 – January 18, 1943) was an American politician from New York.

Life
Foelker was born in Mainz, Germany, and immigrated to the United States in 1888 with his parents. They settled in Troy, New York, where he attended public schools. He moved to Brooklyn in December 1895 and studied law in the New York Law School. He was admitted to the bar in 1908 and commenced practice in Brooklyn.

He was a member of the New York State Assembly (Kings Co., 5th D.) in 1905 and 1906; and of the New York State Senate (4th D.) in 1907 and 1908.

Foelker was elected as a Republican to the 60th United States Congress to fill the vacancy caused by the death of Charles T. Dunwell. He was at the same time elected to the 61st United States Congress, holding office from November 3, 1908, to March 3, 1911. Afterwards Foelker moved to California and resumed the practice of law in Oakland, where he died on January 18, 1943. He was interred at Evergreen Cemetery in Oakland.

References

External links

New York Law School alumni
Burials at Evergreen Cemetery (Oakland, California)
1875 births
1943 deaths
People from Brooklyn
Republican Party members of the New York State Assembly
Republican Party members of the United States House of Representatives from New York (state)
German emigrants to the United States
Politicians from Troy, New York